Čajniče Gospel (/Чајничко јеванђеље) is the oldest gospel written in medieval Bosnia, which probably belonged to the Bosnian noble family, the Pavlovićs, and is the only medieval Bosnian gospel that has been preserved in country to this day. It probably originated at the beginning of the 15th century, and by evaluating the language characteristics and its Ijekavian dialect, it is certain that it originated from ijekavijan eastern Bosnia. The codex was written in shorthand, with a semi-constitution of the Bosnian type, also known as Bosnian Cyrillic. It is estimated that five main scribes took turns, continuously writing the text. The Čajniče Gospel is a four-gospel, and only parts of the Gospel of Matthew, the Gospel of Mark, and most of the Gospel of Luke have been preserved, while the Gospel of John, the beginning and end of the manuscript, and a certain number of pages in the middle are lost, so that in present condition the manuscript has 167 pages. The codex is declared a National monument of Bosnia and Herzegovina. The museum of the Church of the Assumption of the Blessed Mother of God, of the Čajniče Monastery, in Čajniče, Bosnia and Herzegovina, keeps the book

See also
 Hrvoje's Missal
 Hval's Codex

References

Texts of medieval Bosnia and Herzegovina
1400s books
Christian illuminated manuscripts
Gothic art
Christianity in Bosnia and Herzegovina
15th century in Bosnia
Čajniče
Cyrillic manuscripts
Bosnian Church
15th-century illuminated manuscripts
Bosnian Cyrillic texts